Rear Admiral Iain Stuart Lower,  is a senior Royal Navy officer. He was Assistant Chief of the Naval Staff (Policy) 2020-2022.

Naval career
Lower joined the Royal Navy on 1 May 1992. He became commanding officer of the destroyer  in 2009 and, in that capacity, was deployed to the South Atlantic. He went on to become commanding officer of the destroyer  in 2013, Head of Military Plans for Africa and the Americas in 2014, and the Chief of the Defence Staff's personal Liaison Officer to the Chairman of the Joint Chiefs of Staff in Washington, D.C. in 2016. After that he became Director for Strategy, International Relations, Maritime Sector, Parliamentary & Academic Engagement in September 2017, and Assistant Chief of the Naval Staff (Policy) from November 2020 until November 2022, when he retired.

Lower was appointed a Companion of the Order of the Bath in the 2022 Birthday Honours.

References

Living people
Companions of the Order of the Bath
Royal Navy personnel of the War in Afghanistan (2001–2021)
Royal Navy rear admirals
Year of birth missing (living people)